Capital punishment is a legal penalty in Myanmar. It is classified as "Retentionist." Before 25 July 2022, Myanmar was considered "Abolitionist in Practice," meaning a country has not executed anyone in the past ten years or more and is believed to have an established practice or policy against carrying out executions. Between 1988 and 2022, no legal executions were carried out in the country. In July 2022, four democratic activists, including Zayar Thaw and Kyaw Min Yu, were executed.

There have been at least 25,000 extrajudicial killings since the start of the Rohingya genocide on 9 October 2016. Also, two de facto autonomous states, Wa State and Mong La, are reported to carry out executions.

Myanmar abstained from voting regarding the 2020 United Nations moratorium on the death penalty.

There were at least 86 new death sentences in Myanmar in 2021. This was a significant increase on previous years; Amnesty International credits this to the 2021 Myanmar coup d'état, and the subsequent martial law since February of that year. 

Myanmar is one of only three countries believed to have people on death row for crimes committed as juveniles as of 24 May 2022; Myanmar is believed to have at least two, along with Iran with 80, and the Maldives with five. Myanmar also sentenced people to death in absentia in 2021, and sentenced people to death in trials considered unfair, according to Amnesty International.

References

Myanmar
Law of Myanmar